Woodward Township is the name of several places in the U.S. state of Pennsylvania:
Woodward Township, Clearfield County, Pennsylvania
Woodward Township, Clinton County, Pennsylvania
Woodward Township, Lycoming County, Pennsylvania

Pennsylvania township disambiguation pages